The ecclesia or ekklesia (Greek: ἐκκλησία) was the citizens' assembly in the Ancient Greek city-state of Sparta. Unlike its more famous counterpart in Athens, the Spartan assembly had limited powers, as it did not debate; citizens could only vote for or against proposals.

In the pre-War literature, the assembly was often called the apella, but this word refers to a festival of Apollo, the Apellai, during which the ekklesia originally met.

Name 
The pre-War academic literature often refers to the Spartan ekklesia as the apella. However, this word is never found in ancient sources in the singular, and never in a political context. The Apellai were a festival of Apollo where the ekklesia originally met. They were organised once a month, with perhaps one more important feast once a year (called Apellaios), during which elections were presumably organised. In later times, the two events (religious and political) were possibly split. Ancient sources use instead the word ecclesia to designate the political assembly of the Spartans, like in any other Greek city-state. The most important mention comes from Thucydides, who reproduces a verbatim sentence of a decree between Sparta and Argos concluded in 418 or 417, which uses "ecclesia" for the Spartan assembly. The confusion arose from the Rhetra cited by Plutarch, mentioning apellazein, which Plutarch tells it means "to assemble the people", but only in reference to Apollo, the god at the origins of the Rhetra.

Structure 
The meetings had in all probability taken place originally in the Agora but were later transferred to the neighbouring building, known as the Skias. According to Plutarch, a Great Rhetra was given by Pythia to Lycurgus. The old aristocratic council was substituted by the gerousia (thirty elders, including the two kings). Meetings of the ekklesia should take place from time to time, and citizens should have the power to debate and take decisions.<ref>Plut. Lycurg. VI, 1-2.</ref> That right of the citizens was very soon limited. Kings Theopompus and Polydorus, probably during the 7th century BC, added to the "rhetra" that the kings and the elders (gerousia) could set aside any "crooked" decision of the people.

The presiding officers were at first the kings but in historical times the ephors, and the voting was conducted by assessing the loudness of shouting in the crowd. If the president was doubtful as to the majority of voices, a division was taken, and the votes were counted. The ekklesia simply accepted or rejected the proposals submitted to it. In later times, too, the actual debate was almost, if not wholly, confined to the kings, elders, ephors and perhaps the other magistrates. The apella voted on peace and war, treaties and foreign policy in general. It decided the king who should conduct a campaign and settled questions of disputed succession to the throne. It elected elders, ephors and other magistrates, emancipated helots and perhaps voted on legal proposals.

There is a single reference to a "small assembly" at Sparta, but nothing is known as to its nature or competence.

The ekklesia was responsible for electing men to the gerousia for life. Candidates were selected from the aristocrats and presented before the apella. The candidate who received the loudest applause became a member of the gerousia.

The ekklesia also elected the five ephors annually. Ephors presided over meetings of the gerousia and the apella. They could not run for re-election.

The ephorate presented motions before the ekklesia. The ekklesia then voted on the motions. However, unlike the ecclesia in Athens, the ekklesia did not debate; it merely approved or disapproved of measures. Moreover, the gerousia always had the power to veto the decision of the ekklesia.

See also
 Apellai
 Great Rhetra
 Apellaia

Notes

 Bibliography 

 Ancient sources 
 Plutarch, Parallel Lives (Lycurgus).
 Thucydides, History of the Peloponnesian War (translation by Richard Crawley on Wikisource).

 Modern sources 
 G. E. M. de Ste. Croix, The Origins of the Peloponnesian War'', London, Duckworth, 1972. 

Government of Sparta
Historical legislatures
Popular assemblies